This is a list of electoral results for the electoral district of Darlington in Queensland state elections.

Members for Darlington

Election results

Elections in the 1950s

References

Queensland state electoral results by district